The 1886 Stevens football team represented Stevens Institute of Technology as an independent during the 1886 college football season. The team compiled a 0–7–1 record and was outscored by its opponents, 194 to 6.  They were also shut out in seven of their eight contests, nearly avoiding a scoreless year with a 61–6 loss to national champion Princeton.

Schedule

Crickets of Stevens Institute

The Stevens Institute also operated a second team known as the Crickets, who joined the American Football Union for their inaugural 1886 season.  The Crickets compiled a 4–1 record against their opponents in the American Football Union (Their official AFU record would be 3–0, as the Brooklyn Hill contest on October 10 was before the AFU championship series began and November 6 match against the Staten Island Football Club was declared off by the AFU Executive Committee because of poor officiating), and that was enough to crown them Union champions for the season, and to receive the AFU championship pennant in January of the next year.

References

Stevens
Stevens Tech Ducks football seasons
Athletic Club football teams and seasons
College football winless seasons
Stevens football